Lazar Milutinović (born 20 September 1998) is a Serbian football forward who plays for FK Spartak Subotica.

Career
He made his SuperLiga debut on 16 May 2015, in the 29th fixture of the 2014–15 season, against Jagodina.

In January 2022, Milutinović joined FK Spartak Subotica on a three-year deal.

Career statistics

References

External links
 
 

1998 births
Sportspeople from Kragujevac
Living people
Association football forwards
Serbian footballers
FK Radnički 1923 players
FK Spartak Subotica players
Serbian SuperLiga players